Palio nothus is a species of sea slug, a nudibranch, a shell-less marine gastropod mollusc in the family Polyceridae.

Distribution 
This species was described from Prestonpans Bay, Firth of Forth, Scotland. It has subsequently been reported from the United Kingdom north to Scandinavia, Russia and Greenland. It has also been reported from the Pacific coast of Canada.

Ecology
In the north-east Atlantic Palio nothus feeds on bryozoans of the genus Bowerbankia.

References

Polyceridae
Gastropods described in 1838
Taxa named by George Johnston (naturalist)